Masten Gregory (February 29, 1932 − November 8, 1985) was an American racing driver.
He was also a successful sports car racer, winning (with Jochen Rindt) the 1965 24 Hours of Le Mans.

Career
Known as the "Kansas City Flash", Masten Gregory was born in Kansas City, Missouri as the youngest of three children; his elder brother was Riddelle L. Gregory Jr., also a race car driver, and his elder sister Nancy Lee Gregory married, as her second husband, the Anglo-American fashion designer Charles James. An heir to an insurance company fortune, Gregory was well known for his youngish looks and thick eyeglasses, due to his "terrible" eyesight. Although he attended the Pembroke-Country Day School in Kansas City, he left school before completing his senior year, and married Luella Simpson at the age of 19. His parents divorced when he was very young, and his father died when he was three years old. As an adult, Gregory used his inheritance to buy a Mercury-powered Allard, which he drove in his first race, the  SCCA race in Caddo Mills, Texas in November 1952. He retired from that race due to head gasket failure, but installed a new Chrysler hemi-powered engine in his car to race at Sebring in 1953, where he again retired, this time due to a rear suspension failure. Gregory's first win came in just his third race, in Stillwater, Oklahoma. Changing to a Jaguar, Gregory won several races in America, including the Guardsmans Trophy in Golden Gate Park, San Francisco and a race at Offutt Air Force Base in Omaha, Nebraska. At the end of 1953, Gregory was invited to his first international sports car race - the 1954 1000 km Buenos Aires in Argentina, which he finished in 14th due to water pump problems.

Coming to Europe
Throughout 1954 and 1955, Gregory competed in European races, usually driving Ferraris. His record includes the Tourist Trophy at Dundrod and the 24 Hours of Le Mans (although his co-driver Mike Sparken retired before Gregory got a chance to drive). He also won the inaugural Nassau Trophy at the Bahamas Speed Week in 1954.  Moving back to America in 1956, Gregory entered several SCCA races, often winning. In 1957, he had another attempt at the Argentine 1000 km race, this time winning. This performance got him a drive with Guglielmo Dei's Scuderia Centro Sud, a privateer Formula One team using the Maserati 250F. His first race was the 1957 Monaco Grand Prix, where he scored an impressive third-place finish, the first podium for an American in an F1 Grand Prix. He followed this with a string of good results, coming eighth in the German Grand Prix, and fourth in both the Pescara and Italian Grands Prix. Despite only competing in half of the races, Gregory ended the 1957 season in sixth place in the championship.

Gregory only competed in four Grands Prix in the 1958 season, due to injuries sustained through one of his trademark bailouts when his car was set to crash, this time in a sports car race at Silverstone in England. He did manage a fourth place at the Italian Grand Prix, and a 6th in the last race of the year, this Moroccan Grand Prix. Moving to Cooper-Climax for the 1959 season alongside Jack Brabham and Bruce McLaren, he scored two podium finishes - a third place at the Dutch Grand Prix, and a career-best second at the Portuguese Grand Prix. However, he missed the final two races of the season, again due to injuries sustained jumping from a car moments before it crashed. He finished eighth in the Championship, and with teammate Brabham winning the World Championship, Cooper won their first Constructor's Championship. Gregory scored a pole position and set a course record at the non-Championship race at Aintree, but his contract with Cooper was not renewed for the following year.

Gregory's early years of competition were marked by many crashes, often the result of pushing sub-par machinery past its ability. He flipped a thankfully rollbar-equipped Maserati at the Venezuelan Grand Prix in 1957, totalled two sports cars in 1958, and another two in 1959 (a Lister-Jaguar and a Tojeiro-Jaguar). In the latter of these incidents he broke his leg and shoulder, keeping him away from his Formula 1 commitments. In 1960, trying to qualify an outdated Cooper-Maserati at Nürburgring he went off the track and was thrown clear of the car. After this period, however, his driving style matured and he began to develop a reputation as an elegant and careful driver.

Gregory continued in Formula One until 1965, but mainly with uncompetitive independent teams. He was unable to reproduce the results he obtained early in his career, his best being a sixth at the 1962 United States Grand Prix at Watkins Glen with the UDT Laystall team, in a Lotus 24. Running fourth, just behind eventual winner Dan Gurney at the French Grand Prix, Gregory retired with ignition problems, losing possibly his best chance at a maiden Grand Prix victory. Gregory did manage a win in the non-Championship 1962 Kanonloppet race at Karlskoga in Sweden, but this race did not feature any top teams.

After Formula One
After his release from Cooper, Gregory also went back to competing in sports car races, setting the overall fastest lap at the 1960 24 Hours of Le Mans. He won the 1961 1000 km Nürburgring, driving alongside Lloyd "Lucky" Casner in a Maserati Tipo 61 for the America Camoradi Racing Team. In the same year, Gregory finished fifth in the 24 Hours of Le Mans in a Porsche RS61 Spyder. 1962 saw Gregory win the Canadian Grand Prix sports car race at Mosport Park in a Lotus 19-Climax. In 1964, Gregory again competed in the 24 Hours of Le Mans, this time in a Ford GT40. He retired from the race in the fifth hour due to gearbox difficulties. The following year, Gregory teamed up with the man who was to become 1970 Formula One World Champion, Austrian Jochen Rindt, and the pair won the race in a North American Racing Team Ferrari 250 LM. 1965 was also the year in which Gregory raced in the Indianapolis 500, starting from the back of the grid and working his way up to 5th before being forced to retire due to an engine problem.

Gregory then began to wind down his motor racing career, continuing to compete in international sports car races with some good results including a second-place finish at the 1966 1000 km race at Monza alongside John Whitmore. Following his good friend Jo Bonnier's death at the 1972 Le Mans race, Gregory stopped racing, and retired to Amsterdam, where he worked as a diamond merchant before operating a glassware business. On November 8, 1985, Gregory died in his sleep of a heart attack at his winter home in Porto Ercole, Italy. He had four children, Masten Jr., Debbie, Scott and Michael. Gregory was inducted into the Missouri Sports Hall of Fame in 2005, the Kansas City C.A.R.B. (Central Auto Racing Boosters) Hall of Fame in 2007 and the Watkins Glen Walk of Fame in 2012. He was inducted into the Motorsports Hall of Fame of America in 2013.

Gregory is in a distinct club of motorsport being only one of nineteen drivers to compete in all three legs of the Triple Crown of Motorsport (Indianapolis 500, 24 Hours of Le Mans and the Monaco Grand Prix) and to have won at least one of those events. The others are: Louis Chiron, Jack Brabham, Jim Clark, Graham Hill (who won all three), Dan Gurney, Jochen Rindt (who won two), Mario Andretti, Mark Donohue, Jackie Stewart, Denny Hulme, Danny Sullivan, Vern Schuppan, Stefan Johansson, Michele Alboreto, Eddie Cheever, Jacques Villeneuve, Juan Pablo Montoya (who has won two) and Fernando Alonso (who has won two).

Racing record

24 Hours of Le Mans results

Complete Formula One World Championship results
(key)

* Shared drive with Carroll Shelby therefore no points awarded.

Complete Formula One Non-Championship results
(key) (Races in bold indicate pole position; races in italics indicate fastest lap.)

References

 Cox, Michael (2000) "The Kansas City Flash" - The Life & Times of Masten Gregory. Retrieved Jun. 25, 2005.
 Grand Prix.com > Masten Gregory. Retrieved Jun. 27, 2005.
 Hartwell, Andrew S. (2005) Through the Esses - Masten Gregory - Totally Fearless. Retrieved Jun. 27, 2005.
 Cox, Michael J. (2000) 8W - Who? Masten Gregory. Retrieved Jun. 27, 2005.
 Missouri Sports Hall of Fame. Retrieved Jun. 27, 2005.

1932 births
1985 deaths
Sportspeople from Kansas City, Missouri
Racing drivers from Kansas City, Missouri
American Formula One drivers
Indianapolis 500 drivers
24 Hours of Le Mans drivers
24 Hours of Le Mans winning drivers
Scuderia Centro Sud Formula One drivers
BRM Formula One drivers
Maserati Formula One drivers
Cooper Formula One drivers
Camoradi Formula One drivers
British Racing Partnership Formula One drivers
Reg Parnell Racing Formula One drivers
Racing drivers from Missouri
World Sportscar Championship drivers
12 Hours of Reims drivers
Porsche Motorsports drivers
Ecurie Ecosse drivers